Guillaume Perret (born 21 June 1980 in Annecy) is a French jazz musician (tenor saxophone and soprano saxophone, also keyboard) and composer.

References 

French musicians
1980 births
Living people
People from Annecy